Amber Theoharis (born September 13, 1978) is a co-host for NFL Network on NFL Total Access.

Theoharis is a 1996 graduate of Middletown High School and of the University of Maryland. She started her media career in Salisbury, Maryland at WBOC news. and was formerly a sports talk radio host for WJZ-FM, and a sports reporter for WRC-TV in Washington, D.C.

In 2007, Theoharis joined MASN as a reporter. Some of her other duties for MASN included covering the Baltimore Ravens by hosting Ravens Xtra with Wally Williams and Bruce Laird and Playmakers, and reporting during Orioles telecasts. In 2011, instead of covering the Baltimore Orioles team on a day-to-day basis and providing live reports during and after games, she started focusing on interviews and features for the network's "Mid-Atlantic Sports Report," blogging regularly and filling in for sportscaster Jim Hunter alongside Rick Dempsey on the "O's Extra" pre- and post-game shows when Hunter shifts into the booth for play-by-play. She also hosted a sports talk show called The A-List on WJZ-FM 105.7 Baltimore and was a columnist for PressBox.

In September 2012, Theoharis left MASN to work for NFL Network on NFL Total Access, where she replaced longtime co-host, Kara Henderson, who left the network after nine years to start a family. In June 2020, Theoharis became VP of Programming at Clickstream Corporation.

Once named Baltimore's most eligible bachelorette by Forbes, Theoharis is married to Todd Buchler and together they have two daughters.

References

External links
Orioles broadcasters
NFL Network

Baltimore Orioles announcers
Baltimore Ravens announcers
People from Middletown, Maryland
Major League Baseball broadcasters
National Football League announcers
College football announcers
University of Maryland, College Park alumni
Television anchors from Baltimore
Mid-Atlantic Sports Network
Television anchors from Washington, D.C.
Living people
1978 births